Paraamblyseius is a genus of mites in the Phytoseiidae family.

Species
 Paraamblyseius crassipes Denmark, 1988
 Paraamblyseius dinghuensis (Wu & Qian, 1982)
 Paraamblyseius foliatus Corpuz-Raros, 1994
 Paraamblyseius formosanus (Ehara, 1970)
 Paraamblyseius fragariae Gupta, 1980
 Paraamblyseius gloreus (El-Banhawy, 1978)
 Paraamblyseius guangdongensis (Wu & Lan, 1991)
 Paraamblyseius lecanis (Schuster & Pritchard, 1963)
 Paraamblyseius lunatus Muma, 1962
 Paraamblyseius multicircularis Gondim Jr. & Moraes, 2001
 Paraamblyseius mumai (Prasad, 1968)
 Paraamblyseius mumai Gupta, 1980
 Paraamblyseius ogdeni De Leon, 1966

References

Phytoseiidae